Ghiyath al-Din Mahmud, was Sultan of the Ghurid Empire from 1206 to 1212. He was the nephew and successor of Mu'izz al-Din Muhammad.

Rise to power 
Ghiyath was the son of Ghiyath al-Din Muhammad, who was the brother of Mu'izz al-Din Muhammad. When Mu'izz al-Din Muhammad was assassinated in 1206 in India, the Ghurid Empire fell into civil war; the Turkish ghulams supported Ghiyath, while the native Iranian soldiers supported Baha al-Din Sam II. Baha al-Din Sam II, however, died after a few days later, which made the Iranian soldiers support his two sons Jalal al-Din Ali and Ala al-Din Muhammad. Meanwhile, Firuzkuh was controlled by the Ghurid prince Diya al-Din Muhammad. Ghiyath, however, managed to defeat them all and crown himself as Sultan of the Ghurid Empire. However, Jalal al-Din managed to capture Ghazni, and made his brother the ruler of the city.

Reign 

The Turkic general Taj al-Din Yildiz shortly managed to seize Ghazni from the sons of Baha al-Din Sam II, but shortly recognized the authority of Ghiyath. Ghiyath, not glad about Taj al-Din controlling Ghazni, and not daring to leave Ghur unprotected, requested help from the Khwarazmian Muhammad II of Khwarezm. Muhammad, however, instead invaded the domains of Ghiyath, capturing Balkh and Tirmidh. Luckily for Ghiyath, Muhammad was captured by the Kara-Khitan Khanate. Husain ibn Kharmil, a former Ghurid general, who had changed allegiance to the Khwarazmians, shortly entered a negotiation with Ghiyath. However, the negotiation turned fruitless, and Ghiyath sent an army against Husain, which, was, however, defeated.

Thirteen months later, Muhammad was freed from captivity, and once again invaded the domains of Ghiyath, capturing Herat. Muhammad then invaded the Ghurid heartland of Ghur, and captured Ghiyath. Ghiyath then agreed to recognize Muhammad's authority, and remained ruler of the Ghurid dynasty until he was assassinated in 1212. He was succeeded by his son Baha al-Din Sam III.

References

Sources 

 
 

13th-century Iranian people
Ghurid dynasty
1212 deaths
Year of birth missing
Murdered Persian monarchs
13th-century murdered monarchs